Wittgenstein’s Nephew is an autobiographical work by Thomas Bernhard, originally published in 1982. It is a recollection of the author's friendship with Paul Wittgenstein, the nephew of Ludwig Wittgenstein and a member of the wealthy Viennese Wittgenstein family. Paul suffers from an unnamed mental illness for which he is repeatedly hospitalized, paralleling Bernhard's own struggle with a chronic lung disease.

Synopsis

The author narrates moments of his friendship with Paul Wittgenstein, "nephew" (actually son of a first cousin) of the Austrian philosopher Ludwig Wittgenstein (not to be confused with the latter's brother, the pianist Paul Wittgenstein). The title is a reference to Diderot's Rameau's Nephew who also deals with the eccentric nephew of a preeminent cultural figure. A very sensitive man, unsuitable for the world, obsessed by an exclusive and cruel passion for music as well as for race cars and sailing, Paul Wittgenstein dissipated his whole fortune and ultimately died poor.

Their friendship strengthened whilst both recovered in a hospital - Bernhard from a lung ailment and Paul from a bout of madness. The latter will die alone in an asylum, a victim of an incurable conflict with the world; whereas the former will succeed in controlling his own madness, emblem of that very conflict, and making it a lever for his sense of social living.

Through the narration of symptomatic episodes, Bernhard unravels the emptiness of Austrian society, its parasitic and vain aspects, spending its time to self-congratulate on fake recognitions and futile prizes with the same rhythm used to blather and drink coffee in the best Viennese cafés. 

The author gives advice about the importance of literary prizes as the determining factor of artistic worth: "a prize is invariably only awarded by incompetent people who want to piss on your head and who do copiously piss on your head if you accept their prize."

References
 Bernhardiana, a Critical Anthology of Bernhard's works
 "An Introduction to Thomas Bernhard", by Thomas Cousineau (2001)
 The Novels of Thomas Bernhard by J.J. Long (2001)
 Bob Corbett's Comments on Wittgenstein's Nephew (2001)

1982 novels
Novels by Thomas Bernhard
Wittgenstein family